Taipingyang Station, or literally Pacific Ocean Station, is a station of Line 1 of Wuhan Metro. It entered revenue service on April 8, 2006. It is located in Qiaokou District.

The station named "Taipingyang" because there is a soap factory which named "Taipingyang" (literally "Pacific Ocean").

Station layout

Transfers
Bus transfers to Route 1, 2, 5, 46, 56, 208, 622 and 712 are available at Taipingyang Station.

References

Wuhan Metro stations
Line 1, Wuhan Metro
Railway stations in China opened in 2006